Gregor Potočnik (born 22 August 1992) is a Slovenian handball player who plays for Csurgói KK and the Slovenian national team.

He participated at the 2018 European Men's Handball Championship.

References

1992 births
Living people
Sportspeople from Celje
Slovenian male handball players
Expatriate handball players
Slovenian expatriate sportspeople in Croatia
Slovenian expatriate sportspeople in Hungary
21st-century Slovenian people